To be veiled, is to wear a veil

Veiled may also refer to:
Veiled, novel by Benedict Jacka
Veiled, 2009 short film with Kristof Konrad Beth Littleford Leyna Weber
Veiled (album), Leah Andreone 1996
"Veiled", song by Mat Maneri from Trinity (Mat Maneri album)
"Veiled", song by VAS from Offerings (VAS album)